Malika Al-Akkaoui (born 25 December 1987, in Zaida) is a Moroccan middle-distance runner. At the 2012 Summer Olympics, she competed in the Women's 800 metres.  At the 2016 Olympics, she competed in the 800 and 1500 m.

She finished 10th in the 1500m at the 2017 World Athletics Championships.

International competitions

References

External links
 
 
 
 

Moroccan female middle-distance runners
1987 births
Living people
Olympic athletes of Morocco
Athletes (track and field) at the 2012 Summer Olympics
Athletes (track and field) at the 2016 Summer Olympics
World Athletics Championships athletes for Morocco
Mediterranean Games gold medalists for Morocco
Athletes (track and field) at the 2013 Mediterranean Games
Athletes (track and field) at the 2018 Mediterranean Games
Mediterranean Games medalists in athletics
Athletes (track and field) at the 2019 African Games
People from Meknes
African Games competitors for Morocco
Islamic Solidarity Games competitors for Morocco
Islamic Solidarity Games medalists in athletics
20th-century Moroccan women
21st-century Moroccan women